A Gentle Reminder is the second full-length album from American indie rock band, The Jealous Sound. Released after a long hiatus, the recording is the band's second full-length album and followed the 2003 debut album, Kill Them with Kindness.

Reissue
Following the band's move to the roster of Rise Records, an independent record label based in Portland, Oregon, United States (US), a reissue of the album was released on February 5, 2013. The "Deluxe" version features "four previously unreleased songs, five new mixes, and a complete remaster", and was produced in vinyl form (500 white-colored and 1000 blue-colored discs).

Track listing
"Beautiful Morning" - 3:26
"Change You" - 4:51
"Promise of the West" - 4:18
"Your Eyes Were Shining" - 4:43
"This Is Where It Starts" - 3:59
"Here Comes the Ride" - 5:26
"Equilibrium" - 3:52
"Perfect Timing" - 4:38
"A Gentle Reminder" - 4:46
"Waiting for Your Arrival" - 4:38

Reissue
"Beautiful Morning" - 3:26
"Change You" - 4:51
"Promise of the West" - 4:18
"Your Eyes Were Shining" - 4:43
"This Is Where It Starts" - 3:59
"Here Comes The Ride" - 5:26
"Equilibrium" - 3:52
"Perfect Timing" - 4:38
"A Gentle Reminder" - 4:46
"Waiting for Your Arrival" - 4:38
"Full Rewind" - 3:22
"Got Friends?" - 3:25
"Broad Shoulders" - 5:02
"Turning Around" - 3:58

See also
Independent music
Post-punk
Music of California
Music of Oregon

References

External links
Alternative Press review
AbsolutePunk.net review
Daytrotter in-studio concert session

The Jealous Sound albums
2012 albums